LA-21 is a constituency of Azad Kashmir Legislative Assembly which is currently represented by the Sardar Khan Bahadur Khan of Pakistan Muslim League (N). It covers the area of Pallandri in Sudhanoti District of Azad Kashmir, Pakistan.

Election 2016

elections were held in this constituency on 21 July 2016.

Sudhanoti District
Azad Kashmir Legislative Assembly constituencies